The ruddy-breasted seedeater (Sporophila minuta) is a species of bird in the tanager family Thraupidae.
It is found in Brazil, Colombia, Costa Rica, Ecuador, El Salvador, French Guiana, Guatemala, Guyana, Honduras, Mexico, Nicaragua, Panama, Suriname, Trinidad and Tobago, and Venezuela.
Its natural habitats are dry savanna, subtropical or tropical seasonally wet or flooded lowland grassland, and heavily degraded former forest.

Taxonomy
The ruddy-breasted seedeater was formally described by the Swedish naturalist Carl Linnaeus in 1758 in the tenth edition of his Systema Naturae under the binomial name Loxia minuta. The specific epithet is from Latin minutus meaning "little" or "small". The type locality is Suriname. The ruddy-breasted seedeater is now placed in the genus Sporophila that was introduced by the German ornithologist Jean Cabanis in 1844.

Three subspecies are recognised:
 S. m. parva (Lawrence, 1883) – southwest Mexico to Nicaragua
 S. m. centralis Bangs & Penard, TE, 1918 – southwest Costa Rica and south Panama
 S. m. minuta (Linnaeus, 1758) – Trinidad, Tobago and north South America

References

External links

ruddy-breasted seedeater
Birds of Central America
Birds of Colombia
Birds of Venezuela
Birds of Trinidad and Tobago
Birds of the Guianas
ruddy-breasted seedeater
ruddy-breasted seedeater
Birds of the Amazon Basin
Birds of Brazil
Taxonomy articles created by Polbot